USCGC Winslow Griesser (WPC-1116) was the sixteenth  cutter to be delivered.
She will be the fourth of six Sentinel-class vessels to be stationed in San Juan, Puerto Rico.
Bollinger shipyards delivered her to the United States Coast Guard, in Key West, Florida, on December 23, 2015.
After she completed her acceptance trials, she was commissioned on March 11, 2016.

Operational history

The Winslow Griesser participated in the multi-nation training exercise known as Tradewinds 2017, in June 2017.

Namesake

Like all the vessels in her class Winslow Griesser is named after an individual from the Coast Guard's past who has been recognized as a hero.
Winslow W. Griesser was the keeper of the United States Lifesaving Service's Buffalo Station, in 1900.
When he and his crew ventured out in stormy weather to rescue the crew of two scows they saw had overturned, their own surfboat overturned.  
Nevertheless, Griesser and a companion tried to swim out, with a tow rope, to rescue survivors who were clinging tenuously to a pile. Griesser's companion was injured, and Griesser continued, alone.  He reached the pile, and with great difficulty did rescue the sole remaining survivor. Griesser received a gold lifesaving medal to recognize his exceptional bravery in this rescue.

References

Sentinel-class cutters
2015 ships
Ships built in Lockport, Louisiana